Christian Rune Bäckman (born 28 April 1980) is a Swedish former professional ice hockey defenceman.  He played over 300 games in the National Hockey League (NHL) with the St. Louis Blues, New York Rangers and Columbus Blue Jackets, and spent the latter part of his career with Frölunda HC of the Swedish Hockey League.

Playing career
Bäckman was drafted by St. Louis Blues in the 1998 NHL Entry Draft, 1st round, 24th overall. It was not until the 2002–03 NHL season that he got a contract for play in the NHL. He only played four games for St. Louis in his first season, spending the rest of the season playing for Worcester Ice Cats in the American Hockey League (AHL). Between 2003–04 and 2007–08 he was a regular for St. Louis recording 64 points (19 goals, 45 assists), and 130 penalty minutes in 228 games.

During the 2004–05 NHL lockout Bäckman played for his Swedish youth club Frölunda in Elitserien where he totalled 19 points in 50 games, winning the Elitserien playoffs.

St. Louis announced on 10 August 2006 that the club re-signed Bäckman for a multi-year contract, although no contract details was released. According to Swedish newspaper Aftonbladet the contract gives Bäckman 50 million Swedish kronor (approx. $7 million) over three years.

On 26 February 2008, Bäckman was traded to the New York Rangers in exchange for a 4th round draft pick. On 2 March 2008, in his second game as a Ranger, Bäckman scored his first goal as a Ranger on Antero Niittymäki of the Philadelphia Flyers, off assists from Brendan Shanahan and Scott Gomez.

On 2 July 2008, Bäckman was traded, along with Fedor Tyutin, to the Columbus Blue Jackets for Nikolai Zherdev and Dan Fritsche. In October 2009, Bäckman signalled the conclusion of his North American career by signing with Frölunda HC.

Personal life
Bäckman was born 1980 in a small town Alingsås. He has two siblings. He grew up in mostly Alingsås but moved to Gothenburg to start his Ice Hockey career.

Bäckman is married to wife Jeanette  Bäckman. Together they have 3 children. William Bäckman born in 2001, Thea Bäckman born in 2004 and Ellie Bäckman born in 2010. He spends his off-season in Gothenburg, Sweden.

Career statistics

Regular season and playoffs

International

Awards and honors

References

External links
 

 

1980 births
Living people
Columbus Blue Jackets players
Frölunda HC players
Ice hockey players at the 2006 Winter Olympics
Medalists at the 2006 Winter Olympics
National Hockey League first-round draft picks
New York Rangers players
Olympic gold medalists for Sweden
Olympic ice hockey players of Sweden
Olympic medalists in ice hockey
People from Alingsås Municipality
St. Louis Blues draft picks
St. Louis Blues players
Swedish expatriate ice hockey players in the United States
Swedish ice hockey defencemen
Worcester IceCats players
Sportspeople from Västra Götaland County